Christabel Chatonzwa (born 23 April 1990) is a Zimbabwean woman cricketer. She made her One Day International debut in the 2008 Women's Cricket World Cup Qualifier and made her T20I debut at the 2013 ICC Women's World Twenty20 Qualifier. She made her Women's Twenty20 International (WT20I) debut for Zimbabwe against Namibia women on 9 January 2019. In February 2021, she was named in Zimbabwe's squad for their home series against Pakistan.

In November 2021, she was named in Zimbabwe's Women's One Day International (WODI) squad for their series against Bangladesh. She made her WODI debut on 10 November, for Zimbabwe against Bangladesh. Later the same month, she was named in Zimbabwe's team for the 2021 Women's Cricket World Cup Qualifier tournament in Zimbabwe.

References

External links 

1990 births
Living people
Zimbabwean women cricketers
Zimbabwe women One Day International cricketers
Zimbabwe women Twenty20 International cricketers
Eagles women cricketers